H H Sanghanayaka Suddhananda Mahathero (15 January 1933 – 3 March 2020) was a Bangladeshi Buddhist monk. He was awarded Ekushey Padak in 2012 by the Government of Bangladesh for his contribution to social work. He served as the President of Bangladesh Bouddha Kristi Prachar Sangha.

Awards
 Atish Dipankar Gold Award (1997)
 Fellow of Bangla Academy (2005)
 Mahatma Gandhi Peace Award (2007)
 Ekushey Padak (2012)
 Peace Gold Medal (India)

Death
Mahathero died on 3 March 2020 at LabAid Hospital, Dhaka.

References

1933 births
2020 deaths
People from Chittagong
Bangladeshi Buddhist monks
Recipients of the Ekushey Padak
Bangladeshi social workers